Arthur C. Olivier (born August 24, 1957) is an American politician. He is the former mayor of Bellflower, California and was the Libertarian candidate for Vice President in the United States presidential election in 2000 as the running mate of presidential candidate Harry Browne.

Art Olivier is a graduate of Cerritos College with a degree in Design Technology.  He and his wife Joyce have four children.

Olivier served as a councilman (1994–1997), mayor pro tempore (1997–1998) and mayor (1998–1999) of Bellflower, a Los Angeles suburb with 77,000 residents. Olivier is a Realtor with Cogburn Realty.

During his five years on the City Council (1994–99), Olivier privatized the city's tree trimming, crossing guards, street sweeping and the Building Department. He eliminated the city's lighting tax assessment and did not allow eminent domain to be exercised while on council.

Views
During the campaign for vice president, Olivier advocated smaller government, "We have to reduce the size of the federal government back to the size of its constitutional limits." Critical of the U.S. foreign policy of interventionism,   he said he would like the government to return U.S. troops from abroad and make the Department of Defense get back to defending us, and not be a Department of Offense that bombs little countries." "I don't believe we should be the world's policeman." He believes that U.S. foreign policy should be governed by an avoidance of “entangling alliances." "The conflicts this country has entered into cause others to look badly upon America."

Olivier ran uncontested for governor in the 2006 Libertarian primary. He received 114,329 votes (1.3%) in his loss to incumbent Arnold Schwarzenegger in the general election. Olivier criticized Governor Schwarzenegger for passing a budget that was “30% larger than the one that got Governor Gray Davis recalled just three years ago.” Olivier's main earned media was talk radio, advertising his opposition to illegal immigration. Libertarians disagree on illegal immigration, but Olivier was one who favored having the government build a wall on the border and cut off all tax-funded programs to illegals.

Operation Terror
Olivier is supportive of the 9/11 truth movement.   In 2012, he wrote and produced the thriller film Operation Terror, which depicted a fictionalized version of the September 11 attacks in New York City, 2001. The movie's plot centered on a group of American government insiders that organized and assembled a group of people to attack the World Trade Center and the Pentagon. In writing Operation Terror, Olivier used dialogue taken from transcripts of the investigation by the 9/11 Commission and based the film's characters on real-life players in the 9/11 attack.

The film premiered on September 11, 2012, in Los Angeles, and received the Honorable Mention Award at the International Film Festival for Peace, Inspiration and Equality and won the Genre Film: Thriller award at the International Movie Awards. The film's director, Paul Cross, was also nominated for Best Director at the Fajr International Film Festival.

References

External links
 

1957 births
Living people
20th-century American politicians
2000 United States vice-presidential candidates
California Libertarians
Criticism of the official accounts of the September 11 attacks
Libertarian Party (United States) vice presidential nominees
Mayors of places in California
Non-interventionism
People from Bellflower, California
People from Lynwood, California